is a railway station on the Rokko Island Line in Kobe, Hyōgo Prefecture, Japan, operated by Kobe New Transit.

Lines
Minami-Uozaki Station is served by the Rokko Island Line automated guideway transit, and is located 2.0 kilometers from the terminus of the line at Sumiyoshi Station.

Station layout
Minami-Uozaki Station has a single island platform.

Platforms

Adjacent stations

History
Minami-Uozaki Station opened on February 21, 1990.

Railway stations in Kobe
Railway stations in Japan opened in 1990